Maroharana is a town and commune in Madagascar. It belongs to the district of Tsiroanomandidy, which is a part of Bongolava Region. The population of the commune was estimated to be approximately 5,000 in 2001 commune census.

Only primary schooling is available. It is also a site of industrial-scale  mining. The majority 95% of the population of the commune are farmers, while an additional 5% receives their livelihood from raising livestock. The most important crop is rice, while other important products are maize and cassava.

References and notes 

Populated places in Bongolava